The Friday of Sorrows is a solemn pious remembrance of the sorrowful Blessed Virgin Mary on the Friday before Palm Sunday held in the fifth week of Lent (formerly called "Passion Week"). In the Anglican Ordinariate's Divine Worship: The Missal it is called Saint Mary in Passiontide and sometimes it is traditionally known as Our Lady in Passiontide.

In certain Catholic countries, especially in Mexico, Guatemala, Italy, Peru, Brazil, Spain, Malta, and the Philippines, it is the beginning of the Holy Week celebrations and termed as Viernes de Dolores (Friday of Sorrows). It takes place exactly one week before Good Friday, and concentrates on the emotional pain that the Passion of Jesus Christ caused to his mother, the Blessed Virgin Mary, who is venerated under the title Our Lady of Sorrows.

Like all Fridays in Lent, this Friday is a day of abstinence from meat, unless the national episcopal conference has indicated alternative forms of penance.

A similar commemoration in sympathy with the Virgin Mary under the title of Our Lady of Solitude is held on Black Saturday.

History
The first liturgical celebrations for the sorrowful Mary, the Feast of Our Lady of Compassion, occur in the 15th century. In 1668 the Servites were granted permission for a votive Mass to the Seven Sorrows of Mary. In 1692, Pope Innocent XII authorized the celebration of a Feast in honor of Our Lady on the third Sunday of September; which was later transferred to the Friday before Palm Sunday. In 1727, Pope Benedict XIII extended the Feast of Our Lady of Compassion, commemorating the sorrowful Virgin Mary, to the whole of the Latin Church, assigning to its celebration the Friday in Passion Week, one week before Good Friday.

In 1954, the feast still held the rank of major double (slightly lower than the rank of the "Feast of Seven Sorrows of the Blessed Virgin Mary" on 15 September) in the General Roman Calendar. Pope John XXIII's 1960 Code of Rubrics reduced it to the level of a commemoration.

In 1969 the celebration was removed from the General Roman Calendar as a duplicate of the feast on 15 September. Each of the two celebrations had been called a feast of "The Seven Sorrows of the Blessed Virgin Mary" (Latin: Septem Dolorum Beatae Mariae Virginis) and included recitation of the Stabat Mater as a sequence. Since then, the 15 September feast that combines and continues both is known as the Feast of Our Lady of Sorrows (Latin: Beatae Mariae Virginis Perdolentis), and recitation of the Stabat Mater is optional.

Observance of the calendar as it stood in 1962 is still permitted in the Traditional Roman Rite, and even where the calendar as revised in 1969 is in use, some countries, such as Malta, have kept it in their national calendars. In every country, the 2002 edition of the Roman Missal provides an alternative collect for this Friday:

In the last edition of the Tridentine Mass, published under John XXIII in 1962, the Collect was as follows:

In 2015 Divine Worship: The Missal for Anglican Use Catholics restored the observance on the Friday in Passion Week, and provided propers including the Introit Stabant iuxta crucem (Jn 19:25; Ps 56:1), and a modified form of the 1962 Collect: O LORD in whose Passion, according to the prophecy of Simeon, the sword of sorrow did pierce the most loving soul of thy glorious Virgin Mother Mary: mercifully grant that we, who devoutly call to mind the suffering whereby she was pierced, may, by the glorious merits and prayers of all the Saints who have stood beneath the Cross, obtain with gladness the benefits of thy Passion; who livest and reignest with the Father, in the unity of the Holy Spirit, ever one God, world without end. Amen. 
It also restored the Gradual Dolorosa et lacrimabilis, the Tract Stabat sancta Maria (Cf. Lam 1:12), the Sequence Stabat Mater dolorosa, the Offertory Recordare, Virgo Mater (Cf. Jer 18:20), the Communion Felices sensus beatae Mariae and other requisite proper prayers.

Pope Benedict XVI's motu proprio Summorum Pontificum authorizes, under certain conditions, continued use of the 1962 Roman Missal, which contains the feast of the Friday of the fifth week of Lent.

Customs

Celebration of Friday of Sorrows in Malta, Spain, Portugal, Mexico, Costa Rica, Colombia, Venezuela, Ecuador, Peru, Guatemala and the Philippines includes processions, public penance, mournful singing and the mortification of the flesh.

In Italy, the practice is called La Festa dell'Addolorata and uses famous Baroque images made in the area of Naples.

In Malta, Holy Week activities commence on the Friday preceding Good Friday, when the statue of Our Lady of Sorrows is carried in a procession through the streets of Valletta. Many other towns and villages hold their own processions.
 
In Mexico people make small shrines of the Virgen de Dolores in their homes and decorate them with candles, wheat grass and oranges.

In the Philippines, religious floats carry statues of Our Lady of Sorrows and other images in a torchlit procession through the streets. This marks the beginning of the days-long, uninterrupted Pabasa (“reading”), the rite of chanting the Pasiong Mahal, a vernacular epic text centred on the Passion of Christ. In some places, penitents also begin to anonymously roam the streets, whipping themselves and carrying crosses as an annual sacrifice.

In Spain, the Nuestra Señora de los Dolores procession with a statue of Our Lady is held on the Viernes de los Dolores (Friday of Sorrows) on the Friday before Palm Sunday, with a fair featuring local cuisine.

In Portugal, one of the best-known celebrations is the procession of the Seven Sorrows of Our Lady, in Mafra.

Commonly held rituals are religious parades or processions, accompanied by the local singing of Stabat Mater and candle-light vigils.

See also

 Holy Week
 Our Lady of Sorrows
 Stabat Mater

References

Bibliography

 Brugada Martirià. La Virgen de los Dolores: Always at his side , Ed Centre for Pastoral Liturgy, Barcelona 2002, collection Saints and Santas n. 71 (version in Catalan and Spanish)

Holy Week processions
Holy Week
Seven Sorrows of Mary
Friday observances